Ancora Psychiatric Hospital is a 532 active bed (709 capacity) hospital located in the Ancora section of Winslow Township, New Jersey. The hospital offers a multidisciplinary team approach to development and implementation of care. Ancora is the largest of the state's four public psychiatric hospitals. Although the hospital is located in Winslow, it is assigned a Hammonton mailing address.

Most patients at Ancora have been committed involuntarily, as a potential danger to themselves or others.

Criminal investigation and controversy
In 2008, an investigation took place at Ancora by the U.S. Department of Justice. There has been a substantial number of repeated deaths and injuries among patients at the facility, since 2006. The investigation focused on whether patients were safe from harm, and whether residents were served in the most reconciled setting appropriate to their needs, along with their civil rights not violated.

Investigators found that "patients at Ancora suffer an undue risk of harm, stemming from the facility's failure to treat aggressive and self-abusive behavior and its failure to implement systems to protect patients from harm." Ancora also "segregates far too many patients for whom a hospital setting is not appropriate."

See also 
 Rennie v. Klein

References

External links 

 Exploring The Unknown History of Ancora
 Ancora Psychiatric Hospital – NJ Department of Human Services

Hospital buildings completed in 1955
Buildings and structures in Camden County, New Jersey
Hospitals established in 1955
Psychiatric hospitals in New Jersey
Winslow Township, New Jersey
1955 establishments in New Jersey